Edwin Hewitt (January 20, 1920, Everett, Washington – June 21, 1999) was an American mathematician known for his work in abstract harmonic analysis and for his discovery, in collaboration with Leonard Jimmie Savage, of the Hewitt–Savage zero–one law.

He received his Ph.D. in 1942 from  Harvard University, and served on the faculty of mathematics at the University of Washington from 1954.

Hewitt pioneered the construction of the hyperreals by means of an ultrapower construction (Hewitt, 1948).

Hewitt wrote the 1975 English translation of A. A. Kirillov's 1972 Russian monograph Elements of the Theory of Representations (Элементы Теории Представлений), and co-authored Abstract Harmonic Analysis with Kenneth A. Ross (1st edn., 1st vol. in 1963; 1st edn., 2nd vol. in 1970), an extensive work in two volumes.

See also
Cohen–Hewitt factorization theorem

Publications

References 

Edwin Hewitt's work in analysis in Topological Commentary 4 (2)
Edwin Hewitt (1920-1999) in Topological Commentary 6

External links 

 
 Edwin Hewitt (1920–1999) in memoriam by mathematician Walter Schempp

Probability theorists
1920 births
1999 deaths
20th-century American mathematicians
Mathematical analysts
Harvard University alumni
University of Washington faculty
People from Everett, Washington